Edward A. Brooks (July 1, 1942April 23, 2019) was an American politician and farmer from the state of Wisconsin.  He served ten years in the Wisconsin State Assembly, representing Juneau County and parts of northern Richland and Sauk counties.

Background
Brooks was born in Baraboo, Wisconsin, and attended Webb High School in Reedsburg, Wisconsin. He served in the United States Army Reserve. Brooks has received his bachelor's degree in agricultural economics, in 1985, from the University of Wisconsin–Madison. Brooks served on the Reedsburg Town Board and served as chair of the town board. Brooks served in the Wisconsin State Assembly from 2008 to 2019 and was a Republican. Brooks died from leukemia on April 23, 2019.

Wisconsin Legislature
Brooks served on the Wisconsin Assembly agriculture and criminal justice legislative committees. He also served on the urban and local affairs legislative committee and served as the chair of the committee.

References

1942 births
2019 deaths
People from Baraboo, Wisconsin
Military personnel from Wisconsin
Farmers from Wisconsin
University of Wisconsin–Madison College of Agricultural and Life Sciences alumni
Republican Party members of the Wisconsin State Assembly
Wisconsin city council members
Mayors of places in Wisconsin
People from Reedsburg, Wisconsin
21st-century American politicians
Deaths from leukemia
Deaths from cancer in Wisconsin
United States Army reservists